Bøhn is a Norwegian surname. Notable people with the surname include:

Karl Erik Bøhn (1965–2014), Norwegian handball player and coach
Knut Bøhn (1926–1985), Norwegian businessman and judge
Ole Bøhn (born 1945), Norwegian violinist

See also
Bohn, a German surname

Norwegian-language surnames